Arthur Paget may refer to:

Sir Arthur Paget (diplomat) (1771–1840), British diplomat and politician
Sir Arthur Paget (British Army officer) (1851–1928), soldier and diplomat, who served in Belgrade and Ireland